Brigitte Fink was an Italian luger who competed during the 1950s. She won the bronze medal in the women's singles event at the 1957 FIL World Luge Championships in Davos, Switzerland.

References
Hickok sports information on World champions in luge and skeleton.

Italian female lugers
Italian lugers
Possibly living people
Year of birth missing
Sportspeople from Südtirol